Weteringbrug is a village in the Dutch province of North Holland. It is a part of the municipality of Haarlemmermeer, and lies about 9 km north of Alphen aan den Rijn.

The village was first mentioned in 1936 as Weteringbuurt. The current name means "bridge of the Oude Wetering (river)".

Gallery

References

Populated places in North Holland
Haarlemmermeer